Idu was an official during the Sixth Dynasty, buried in Giza East Field, tomb G7102. He probably lived and served during the reign of Pepi I Meryre. He is the father of Qar whose tomb is nearby and Bendjet, buried in G7215.

Tomb 
G7102 lies in cemetery G7000 east of the related tomb of Qar. The mastaba exterior superstructure has disappeared.

Family 
The tomb depicts several members of his family:

 Wife: Meretyotes. Note than this woman is not the mother of Qar (G7101).
 Daughters: Bendjet (identified as the owner of G7215), Iry
 Sons: Qar, Idu and Hemi

Dependents 
Several dependents of Qar were also represented with their most relevant titles:

 Indifiyni, steward (imy-rȝ pr).
 Isi, scribe (zš).
 idu, Ka servant (ḥm-kȝ).
 Idu,
 Ankhenf, Ka servant.
 Pehen-Path, scribe, inspector of the Ka servants (zš, sḥḏ ḥm(w)-kȝ).
 Nykhety, steward (wdpw).Nefermenekhet, singer (ḥst).
 Nekhet, scribe, steward.
 Qar, steward.
 Tidui, steward.

Titles 
His titles were:

References

External links 
  The Digital Giza at Harvard Faculty of Arts and Sciences hosts 147 photos of the tomb, most of them taken at the time of the discovery in 1925.

Year of death unknown
People of the Sixth Dynasty of Egypt
Ancient Egyptian officials
Date of birth unknown